Konstantinos Stamoulis (born 29 October 2000) is a Greek professional footballer who plays as a right-back for Super League 2 club AEK Athens B.

Personal life
Stamoulis' younger brother, Georgios, is also a professional footballer.

References

2000 births
Living people
Greek footballers
Greece youth international footballers
Super League Greece players
AEK Athens F.C. players
Association football defenders
Footballers from Patras
AEK Athens F.C. B players
PAS Lamia 1964 players